Govinda Manikya (d. 1676) was the Maharaja of Tripura from 1660 to 1661 and again from 1667 to 1676. Though viewed as a capable and successful ruler, Govinda's reign was interrupted by his temporary overthrow and usurpation by his younger brother.

Life
The eldest son of Maharaja Kalyan Manikya, Govinda succeeded upon the latter's death in 1660. However, he was overthrown within a year of his ascension by his brother, Chhatra Manikya, who claimed the throne with the aid of the Mughal Empire, forcing Govinda into exile.

Govinda fled into the Chittagong Hill Tracts where, according to the Rajmala, he developed a friendship with Shah Shuja, the similarly exiled brother of the Mughal emperor Aurangzeb. However, chronological data indicates that a meeting between the two princes is impossible. Govinda later took refuge in Arakan, whose ruler aided him in recovering Tripura in 1667. Accounts are contradictory regarding whether Govinda had Chhatra killed at this point, or if the latter had already died previously.

To placate the Mughals, at whose behest his brother had become ruler, Govinda agreed to send five elephants annually as tribute to the emperor. Govinda generally maintained good relations with the empire, with Tripura being able to enjoy a de facto independent status. He is viewed as having been an able administrator, as well as a patron of the arts and learning. During his reign, the third section of the Rajmala was completed and the Brihannaradiya Purana was translated into Bengali.

Govinda died in 1676 and was succeeded by his son Rama Manikya. Centuries later, he was immortalised by his depictions in the plays of Rabindranath Tagore, Visharjan and Rajarshi.

References

Kings of Tripura
History of Tripura
Dethroned monarchs
Rabindranath Tagore
1676 deaths